(also written 2015 AZ43) is an Apollo near-Earth asteroid roughly 70 meters in diameter. On 10 February 2015 with a 29.5-day observation arc, it showed a 1 in 5,880 chance of impacting Earth on 27 February 2107. However, the NEODyS nominal best-fit orbit shows that  will be  from Earth on 27 February 2107. A (non-impacting) Earth close approach in 2056 makes future trajectories diverge. It was removed from the JPL Sentry Risk Table on 23 February 2015 using JPL solution 26 with an observation arc of 40 days that included radar data.

With an absolute magnitude of 23.5, the asteroid is about 50–120 meters in diameter.

2015 flyby
 was discovered on 11 January 2015 by Pan-STARRS at an apparent magnitude of 20 using a  Ritchey–Chrétien telescope. On 15 February 2015 the asteroid passed  from Earth. The Goldstone Deep Space Network detected the asteroid on 18–19 February 2015, but the signal was not strong enough for delay-Doppler imaging.

References

External links 
 2015 AZ43 Orbit Minor Planet Center
 
 
 

Minor planet object articles (unnumbered)

20150215
20150111